The men's water polo tournament at the 1992 Summer Olympics was held from 1 to 10 August 1992, in Barcelona, Spain. Reigning world champion Yugoslavia had qualified for the tournament, but as it had formally dissolved in the interim, it did not participate. The successor countries did not participate for several reasons. The Federal Republic of Yugoslavia (Serbia and Montenegro) could not participate due to the UN sanctions due to their aggression on Croatia and Bosnia and Herzegovina. Croatia, which was the strongest among them at the time (the Croatian club was champion of Yugoslavia and European Champions' Cup winner), also did not participate in the water polo tournament. The position of Yugoslavia was replaced by Czechoslovakia.

Qualification

Teams

GROUP A

GROUP B

Squads

Preliminary round

Group A

1 August 1992

2 August 1992

3 August 1992

5 August 1992

6 August 1992

Group B

1 August 1992

2 August 1992

3 August 1992

5 August 1992

6 August 1992

Final round

Group D

8 August 1992

9 August 1992

Group E

8 August 1992

9 August 1992

Semi finals
8 August 1992

Bronze medal match
9 August 1992

Gold medal match
9 August 1992

Final ranking

Medallists

See also
1991 FINA Men's World Water Polo Championship
1994 FINA Men's World Water Polo Championship

References

Sources
 PDF documents in the LA84 Foundation Digital Library:
 Official Report of the 1992 Olympic Games, v.5 (download, archive) (pp. 354, 386–400)
 Water polo on the Olympedia website
 Water polo at the 1992 Summer Olympics (men's tournament)
 Water polo on the Sports Reference website
 Water polo at the 1992 Summer Games (men's tournament) (archived)

External links
 Results

 
1992 Summer Olympics events
O
1992
1992